Fourteen at the Table (Czech:Ctrnáctý u stolu) is a 1943 Czechoslovak film directed by Oldřich Nový and Antonín Zelenka and starring Karel Höger, Ludvík Veverka and Helena Friedlová.

It was made in German-occupied Czechoslovakia, where a Czech-language cinema continued to exist. The screenplay was based on a story by the retired German silent film actress Ossi Oswalda. The film's sets were designed by the art director Jan Zázvorka.

Plot
13 guests meet at the home of Mayor Bartoš. They are disturbed by the number, so they hope and wait for another guest to appear. A 14th guest does arrive, with the coincidental name of Fourteen (Ctrnáctý ). Everything would be fine, but when detective Pavel Čtrnáctý looks at the mayor's daughter, Ema, he cannot resist her charm. The girl suddenly becomes the subject of gossip.

Cast
 Karel Höger as Pavel Ctrnáctý  
 Ludvík Veverka as Bartos  
 Helena Friedlová as Bartosová  
 Dagmar Frýbortová as Ema  
 Vladimír Majer as Dr. Viktorin  
 Karel Dostal as Bersecký  
 Růžena Šlemrová as Bersecká  
 Libuše Zemková as Lydie  
 Raoul Schránil as Alexy  
 Jiřina Petrovická as Bibi  
 Ella Nollová as Hedvika, grandmother  
 Zvonimir Rogoz as Linhart  
 Jarmila Svabíková as Linhartová  
 František Filipovský as Kilián  
 Nelly Gaierová as Holá  
 Jirí Vondrovic 
 Anna Gabrielová as Chambermaid  
 Anna Steimarová as Betty  
 Slávka Dolezalová
 Jan Fifka as Bersecký's Guest  
 Marie Vildová as Chambermaid

References

Bibliography 
 Bock, Hans-Michael & Bergfelder, Tim. The Concise CineGraph. Encyclopedia of German Cinema. Berghahn Books, 2009.

External links 
 

1943 films
1940s Czech-language films
Czech comedy films
1943 comedy films
Czech black-and-white films
1940s Czech films